Tommaso Marini (born 17 April 2000) is an Italian right-handed foil fencer, 2022 team European champion, and 2022 team world champion.

Medal Record

World Championship

European Championship

Grand Prix

World Cup

References

External links 
 

Living people
2000 births
Place of birth missing (living people)
Italian male foil fencers
21st-century Italian people
World Fencing Championships medalists